Comana is a commune in Constanța County, Northern Dobruja, Romania.

The commune includes three villages:
 Comana (historical name:  Mustafa Agi)
 Tătaru (historical name: Azaplar)
 Pelinu (historical name: Carachioi)

The former village of Orzari (historical name: Erebiler) was merged with the village of Comana by the 1968 administrative reform.

Demographics
At the 2011 census, Comana had 1,543 Romanians (89.50%), 17 Turks (0.99%), 161 Tatars (9.34%), 3 others (0.17%).

Natives
 Şahip Bolat Abdurrahim from Azaplar/Tătaru, Mufti of Constanța County (1933-1937)
 Septar Mehmet Yakub from Azaplar/Tătaru, Mufti of Romania (1947-1990)

References

Communes in Constanța County
Localities in Northern Dobruja